In 2013–2014, Exeter participated in Football League Two and the Football League Cup, but they were eliminated in the First Round of the competition by  Queens Park Rangers. In the FA Cup Exeter City were knocked out by Peterborough United in the First Round. In the League 2 season, Exeter finished in 16th.

First-team squad

Competitions

Football League Two

League table

Results

FA Cup

Football League Cup

Football League Trophy

References 

2013-14
2013–14 Football League Two by team